The Gumbs cabinet was a coalition cabinet in Sint Maarten formed by the United People's Party and independent members of Parliament Cornelius de Weever and Leona Marlin-Romeo.

The cabinet succeeded the Third Wescot-Williams cabinet following the 2014 general elections, and was installed by Governor Eugene Holiday on 19 December 2014. It fell on 30 September following a vote of non-confidence with 3 coalition party members voting in favour.

Composition
The cabinet is composed as follows:

|Prime Minister
|Marcel Gumbs
|UP
|19 December 2014
|-
|rowspan="2"|Minister of Housing, Physical Planning, and Environment
|Marcel Gumbs (interim)
|UP
|19 December 2014
|-
|Claret M. Connor
|UP
|7 September 2015
|-
|Minister of Finance
|Martinus J. Hassink
|
|19 December 2014
|-
|Minister of Justice
|Dennis L. Richardson
|USP
|19 December 2014
|-
|rowspan="2"|Minister of Tourism, Economic Affairs, Transport and Telecommunications
|Claret M. Connor
|UP
|19 December 2014
|-
|Ernest Sams 
|
|7 September 2015
|-
|rowspan="2"|Minister of Healthcare, Social Development, and Labor
|Rita Gumbs (interim)
|UP
|19 December 2014
|-
|Rafael Boasman
|
|7 September 2015
|-
|Minister of Education, Culture, Youth, and Sports
|Rita Gumbs
|UP
|19 December 2014
|-
|Minister Plenipotentiary of Sint Maarten
|Josianne Fleming-Artsen
|UP
|19 December 2014
|}

 Ernest Sams was put forward on Leona Marlin-Romeo's recommendation, while Rafael Boasman was recommended by Cornelius de Weever.

References

Gumbs
2014 establishments in Sint Maarten
Cabinets established in 2014
2015 disestablishments in Sint Maarten
Cabinets disestablished in 2015